is a Japanese lacquer decoration technique in which pictures, patterns, and letters are drawn with lacquer on the surface of lacquerware, and then metal powder such as gold or silver is sprinkled and fixed on the surface of the lacquerware. The origin of the term maki-e is a compound word of maki meaning "sprinkling" and e meaning "picture" or "design". The term can also be used to refer to lacquerware made with this decorative technique. The term  first appeared in the Heian period.

This technique is the most used technique in Japanese lacquer decoration.

To create different colours and textures,  artists use a variety of metal powders including gold, silver, copper, brass, lead, aluminum, platinum, and pewter, as well as their alloys. Bamboo tubes and soft brushes of various sizes are used for laying powders and drawing fine lines. As it requires highly skilled craftsmanship to produce a  painting, young artists usually go through many years of training to develop the skills and to ultimately become  masters.  (1410–1478) was the first lacquer master linked to specific works. His  works used designs from various Japanese contemporary painters. Kōami and another  master, were originators of the two major schools of lacquer-making in the history of Japan.

Major techniques and their history

Classification by manufacturing process 
These  processes are started after the normal lacquerware process is finished. In other words, it is necessary to make a thick foundation layer of lacquer in advance by repeating a series of works such as coating the wood or paper with lacquer using a spatula or brush, drying it and polishing it.

At the first stage, a preliminary sketch process called  is performed. If the picture or pattern is simple, this process may be omitted. The next step, called , is the preparation process before metal powder is sprinkled. Lacquer is applied to the place where metal powder is to be sprinkled and it is used as an adhesive. Then, in a process called  metal powder is sprinkled using a bird's feather shaft or a bamboo tube. In the next  process, lacquer is applied on top of metal powder to protect the metal powder, and then the lacquer is dried. The first polishing is performed in the next  process. The lacquer is slightly polished to expose only the surface of the metal powder with the metal powder embedded in the lacquer. In the subsequent polishing process, the entire lacquerware is polished with abrasives of different particle sizes. In addition, in the middle of each polishing process, a process called  is inserted, in which a series of processes of rubbing lacquer onto lacquerware and drying it are repeated. Glossy  is completed through these complicated processes.

 and  have the same process up to the  where they apply lacquer to protect the metal powder. However, the subsequent processes are different, and  uses a process called  in which the entire lacquerware including pictures and patterns is coated with black lacquer. After drying, it is polished until the surface of the metal powder is exposed. It was a technique developed and completed in the Heian period, and this technique was the mainstream of  until the late Heian period when the refining technique of gold and silver powder was undeveloped and the particles were rough. Because a sword scabbard in the Nara period kept at Shōsōin uses a technique called  similar to this technique, it is sometimes said that Japanese  began during the Nara period.。

A lacquer is mixed with charcoal or mineral particles to make a lacquer with increased viscosity, and a pattern is drawn on the surface to raise the pattern. This technique was developed in the middle of the Kamakura period. In the Muromachi period,  was developed by mixing lacquer with powdered whetstone or powdered clay, and it became possible to raise the pattern higher.。

It is the most complicated technique among , and was developed in the Muromachi period and was popular in the Edo period.。

Classification by size and shape of metal powder 
Fine particles  are easy to work with, but the adhesion of the particles is weak, and the color becomes whitish with little gloss and looks dull. Large particles  are difficult to work with but have high durability, and have a strong luster and a flashy appearance due to irregular reflection of particles.

Gallery

Maque
The Mexican word  derives from the Japanese word. It is used for "Mexican lacquerware". Japanese lacquerware arrived to Mexico through the Manila galleons during the Namban period. Mexican artisans fused pre-Hispanic, European and Asian influences in their work.

References

 Lacquerware stories/maki-e

External links
 
 Maki-e at Britannica

Artistic techniques
Decorative arts
Japanese art terminology
Japanese lacquerware
Painting techniques